Juan Pierre de Villiers (born 5 April 1989) is a South African first-class cricketer who plays for the Titans cricket team.

References

External links
 

1989 births
Living people
South African cricketers
Titans cricketers
Northerns cricketers